The Ministry  of Education and Science (MOEAS) is the central state administering body which is responsible for the creation of nationwide policies relating to education, academic activities and science. The Ministry sets standards for education levels, schedules the school year, approves secondary education textbooks, administers the national entrance exam, provides support to regional education agencies, and issues licenses to establish higher education institutions. The current minister since 29 Jan 2021 is Luvsantserengiin Enkh-Amgalan.

External links
 Official website of Ministry of Education, Culture, Science, and Sports (in English).

Mongolia
Mongolia
Government ministries of Mongolia